Alison Bai (born 18 January 1990) is a professional Australian tennis player. Her highest WTA singles ranking is No. 305, which she reached on 2 November 2015. Her career-high in doubles is No. 125, set on 20 January 2020.

On the ITF Circuit, Bai won her first singles title in 2015 at the $15k event on grass in Mildura having reached the final the previous year. In 2018, she reached the final of the $25k event in Changsha, China, defeating top seed Zhu Lin in the second round.

She has also won thirteen doubles titles on the ITF Circuit, including two titles at $60k tournaments in Canberra (with Zoe Hives in 2017) and Baotou (with Aleksandrina Naydenova in 2018). In 2018, she achieved her best result on the WTA Tour, reaching the doubles semifinal of the Hobart International, partnering Lizette Cabrera.

ITF Circuit finals

Singles: 3 (1 title, 2 runner-ups)

Doubles: 34 (13 titles, 21 runner-ups)

Notes

References

External links
 
 
 
 

1990 births
Living people
Australian female tennis players
Sportspeople from Canberra
Tennis people from the Australian Capital Territory
Sportswomen from the Australian Capital Territory
Australian people of Chinese descent
Australian people of Filipino descent
Australian sportspeople of Asian descent
Sportspeople of Filipino descent
Monash University alumni
21st-century Australian women